Pikaboo is a European children's cable channel that started broadcasting on 4 December 2017. The channel is owned by United Media, part of United Group. It is broadcast in Croatia and Bosnia and Herzegovina in Croatian, in Serbia, Montenegro and Republika Srpska in Serbian, in Slovenia in Slovenian, in North Macedonia in Macedonian, and in Albania and Kosovo in Albanian. It is broadcast 24 hours a day.

Dubbing
Serbian dubbing for this channel was done by the studio Blue House, but the dubbings of the studios Gold Digi Net and Loudworks made earlier for other channels, are also broadcast. The cartoon series Chickens was dubbed by studio IDJ, Lola and Mila by studio Audio Wizard M&D, and Ben 10 by Vamos Production, although these series are broadcast for the first time.

References

Radio and Television of Bosnia and Herzegovina
Television networks in Serbia
Television networks in Bosnia and Herzegovina
Television networks in Montenegro
Television channels and stations established in 2017
Television channels in North Macedonia
Children's television channels in North Macedonia